Patkonan-e Bala (also Romanized as Patkonān-e Bālā; also known as Napkonān, Patkonān, Patkonow-ye Bālā, and Patkonū-ye Bālā) is a village in Siyahu Rural District, Fin District, Bandar Abbas County, Hormozgan Province, Iran. At the 2006 census, its population was 83, in 25 families.

References 

Populated places in Bandar Abbas County